Padung (Dutch: padoeng; also known as padungor) is a type of earring worn by the Karo people of northern Sumatra, Indonesia. The large earrings are attached to a headdress so as not to tear the earlobe. Padung can be made of copper alloy, silver, bronze, brass, or gold. The design is phallic.

Gallery

Further reading
Knickerbocker Weekly, Volume 7 Netherlands Publishing Corporation, 1947, described the marriage rituals associated with the earrings

References

Batak Karo
Types of jewellery
Indonesian culture